Fung Yik (born 3 December 1959) is a Hong Kong archer. He competed in the men's individual event at the 1992 Summer Olympics.

References

External links
 

1959 births
Living people
Hong Kong male archers
Olympic archers of Hong Kong
Archers at the 1992 Summer Olympics
Place of birth missing (living people)